The F.A.M.E. Tour was the second concert tour by Colombian singer Maluma, in support of his third studio album, F.A.M.E. (2018). The tour began on March 23, 2018, in Fairfax, Virginia and concluded on December 29, 2018, in Cartagena, Colombia.

Setlist
This set list is representative of the show on March 25, 2018, in New York City. It is not representative of all concerts for the duration of the tour.

 "23"
 "El Préstamo"
 "Corazón"
 "Vitamina"
 "Chantaje"
 "La Bicicleta (Remix)"
 "Vente Pa' Ca"
 "Party Animal"
 "Sin Contrato"
 "Borró Cassette"
 "Carnaval"
 "Me Llamas (Remix)"
 "Felices los 4"
 "El Perdedor"
 "Pretextos"
 "Vuelo Hacia el Olvido"
 "GPS"
 "Trap"
 "Cuatro Babys"

Shows

Notes

References

Maluma concert tours
2018 concert tours
Concert tours of North America
Concert tours of Europe
Concert tours of Asia